Wierdapark is a suburb of Centurion, Gauteng, near Pretoria, and is located in the province of Gauteng, South Africa.

History 
Wierdapark was named after the chief architect of the Transvaal Republic, Sytze Wopkes Wierda, who engineered the Wierda Bridge. The area in which the suburb is located was once part of a farm known as Cyferfontein.

References 

Suburbs of Centurion, Gauteng